Maurice Pouzet (February 20, 1921 - January 17, 1997) was a French illustrator.

1921 births
1997 deaths
French illustrators